The 1906 Southern Intercollegiate Athletic Association football season was the college football games played by the member schools of the Southern Intercollegiate Athletic Association as part of the 1906 college football season. The season began on September 29.

At the end of 1905 football looked about to be abolished due to all of the reoccurring violence during games. Football was a sport that had degenerated into dangerous tactics such as: the flying wedge, punching, kicking, piling-on, and elbows to the face. Almost any violent behavior was allowed. Fatalities and injuries mounted during the 1905 season.

As a result, the 1906 season was played under a new set of rules. The rules governing intercollegiate football were changed to promote a more open and less dangerous style of play. An intercollegiate conference, which would become the forerunner of the NCAA, approved radical changes including  the legalization of the forward pass, allowing the punting team to recover an on-side kick as a live ball, abolishing the dangerous flying wedge, creating a neutral zone between offense and defense, and doubling the first-down distance to 10 yards, to be gained in three downs.

According to Fuzzy Woodruff, Davidson tossed the first legal forward pass in the South in the win over Georgia.

Clemson and Vanderbilt tied for the SIAA title, but few writers chose the Tigers over the vaunted Commodores. Coach Dan McGugin called the Carlisle victory "the crowning feat of the Southern Intercollegiate Athletic Association season." For some, Vanderbilt's eleven was the entire All-Southern team.  Running back Owsley Manier was the first Southern player chosen third-team All-American by Walter Camp.

Results and team statistics

Key

PPG = Average of points scored per game
PAG = Average of points allowed per game

Regular season

SIAA teams in bold.

Week One

Week Two

Week Three

Week Four

Week Five

Week Six

Week Seven

Week Eight

Week Nine

Week Ten

Awards and honors

All-Americans

FB – Owsley Manier, Vanderbilt (WC-3)

All-Southern team

The composite All-Southern  eleven representing the consensus of newspapers as published in Fuzzy Woodruff's A History of Southern Football 1890–1928 included:

Notes

References